Ray Bachelor was an English football coach who was the first ever manager of the Kenyan national side. Bachelor later managed Kenyan club side Nakuru AllStars, first ever winners of the Kenyan Premier League.

References

Year of birth missing
English football managers
Expatriate football managers in Kenya
Year of death missing